Ane (Dutch Low Saxon: Aone) is a village in the Dutch province of Overijssel. It is located in the municipality Hardenberg, about 5 km northeast of the centre of Hardenberg.

In 1227, the Battle of Ane was fought during which the bishop of Utrecht was defeated by the citizens of Drenthe. In 1840, it was home to 358 people. In 1864, the gristmill  was built. It was restored in 1981.

References

Populated places in Overijssel
Hardenberg